Chondritis  is inflammation of cartilage.

It takes several forms, osteochondritis, costochondritis, and relapsing polychondritis among them. Costochondritis is notable for feeling like a heart attack.

See also
 Chondropathy
 Chondrolysis
 Perichondritis, commonly involving the outer ear
 Relapsing polychondritis

References

Rheumatology